Paratrigonoides is a monotypic genus of bees belonging to the family Apidae. The only species is Paratrigonoides mayri.

The species is found in Colombia.

References

Apidae